The Czech Republic women's national under-16 and under-17 basketball team is a national basketball team of the Czech Republic, administered  by the Czech Basketball Federation.  The team competes at the FIBA U16 Women's European Championship and the FIBA Under-17 Women's Basketball World Cup.

FIBA U16 Women's European Championship participations

FIBA Under-17 Women's Basketball World Cup participations

See also
Czech Republic women's national basketball team
Czech Republic women's national under-19 basketball team
Czech Republic men's national under-17 basketball team

References

External links
Official website 
Archived records of the Czech Republic team participations

Basketball in the Czech Republic
under-17
Basketball
Women's national under-16 basketball teams
Women's national under-17 basketball teams